Natasha Wimmer (born 1973) is an American translator best known for her translations of Chilean novelist Roberto Bolaño's 2666 and The Savage Detectives from Spanish into English.

Wimmer learned Spanish in Spain, where she spent four years growing up. She studied Spanish literature at Harvard. After graduating her first job was at Farrar, Straus & Giroux from 1996 to 1999 as an assistant and then managing editor. While there her first translation was Dirty Havana Trilogy by the Cuban novelist Pedro Juan Gutiérrez.

She then worked at Publishers Weekly, before the demands on working on Bolaño's books became full-time.  "My reason for going into publishing in the first place was that I had decided in college that I would never be a fiction writer, but I knew I wanted to be as close to books as I could. Publishing was one way, and translating turned out to be a better way for me."

She has also translated Nobel Prize-winner Mario Vargas Llosa's The Language of Passion, The Way to Paradise, and Letters to a Young Novelist; and Marcos Giralt Torrente's Father and Son.

Wimmer received the PEN Translation Prize in 2009.

Notes

Living people
1973 births
Harvard University alumni
Spanish–English translators
20th-century American translators
21st-century American translators
20th-century American women writers
21st-century American women writers